The 7th Annual Tony Awards, presented by the American Theatre Wing, took place at the Waldorf-Astoria Starlight Ballroom, on March 29, 1953. The Antoinette Perry Awards for Excellence in Theatre, more commonly known as the Tony Awards, recognize achievement in Broadway theatre. The event was broadcast on radio by the National Broadcasting Company. The presenter was Faye Emerson. Music was by Meyer Davis and his Orchestra.

Award winners
Source:Infoplease

Production

Performance

Craft

Special awards
Beatrice Lillie, for An Evening with Beatrice Lillie.
Danny Kaye, for heading a variety bill at the Palace Theatre.
Equity Community Theatre.

Multiple nominations and awards

The following productions received multiple awards.

5 wins: Wonderful Town 
2 wins: The Crucible, Hazel Flagg and Wish You Were Here

References

External links
Tony Awards Official Site

Tony Awards ceremonies
1953 in theatre
1953 awards
1953 in the United States
Tony Awards
1953 awards in the United States
March 1953 events in the United States